The Cuckoos is a 1930 American Pre-Code musical comedy film released by RKO Radio Pictures and partially filmed in two-strip Technicolor. Directed by Paul Sloane, the screenplay was adapted by Cyrus Wood from the 1926 Broadway musical The Ramblers by Guy Bolton, Bert Kalmar and Harry Ruby. The film stars Bert Wheeler and Robert Woolsey, and while they had appeared on Broadway and in other films together (most notably RKO's Rio Rita the year before), this was their first time starring as a team. The success of this picture, combined with Rio Rita being their most successful film of 1929, convinced the studio to headline them as the comedy team Wheeler & Woolsey, through 1937.

Plot
Professor Bird (Woolsey) and his partner, Sparrow (Wheeler), are a pair of charlatan fortune tellers who are bankrupt and stranded at a Mexican resort just south of the border. An heiress, Ruth Chester (June Clyde), appears, who is running away from her aunt, Fanny Furst (Jobyna Howland). She is in love with an American pilot, Billy Shannon (Hugh Trevor), but her aunt wishes her to marry the European nobleman, The Baron (Ivan Lebedeff), whom the aunt believes is the "right" type of person for her niece.

Sparrow, meanwhile has fallen in love with a young American girl, Anita (Dorothy Lee), who has been living with a band of Gypsies. This creates an issue, since the leader of the Gypsy band, Julius (Mitchell Lewis), has had his eye on Anita for years.

When Fannie Furst arrives, she attempts to persuade Ruth into marrying the Baron, but unbeknownst by Fannie, The Baron is only interested in marrying Ruth for her money.  During the course of events, Fannie falls in love with Bird, but when the Baron finds out that Ruth is engaged to Billy, he conspires with Julius to kidnap her.  During the kidnapping, Anita is also taken, and the girls are taken deeper into Mexico. Bird, Sparrow and Billy track them down and recover the girls, and they live happily ever after.

Cast
Bert Wheeler as Sparrow
Robert Woolsey as Professor Bird
Dorothy Lee as Anita
Jobyna Howland as Fannie Furst
Hugh Trevor as Billy Shannon
June Clyde as Ruth Chester
Ivan Lebedeff as The Baron
Marguerita Padula as Gypsy Queen
Mitchell Lewis as Julius

Song List
All songs are music by Harry Ruby with lyrics by Bert Kalmar, unless otherwise noted.
"Down in Mexico" - chorus
"Oh! How we love our Alma Mater" - Bert Wheeler and Robert Woolsey
"All Alone Monday" - June Clyde and Hugh Trevor
"California Skies" - chorus
"Wherever You Are" - Hugh Trevor and June Clyde
"I'm a Gypsy" - Robert Woolsey
"Goodbye" - Bert Wheeler, Robert Woolsey and Jobyna Howland with chorus
"Tomorrow Never Comes - Raymond Maurel with chorus
"I Love You So Much (It's a Wonder You Don't Feel It)" - Dorothy Lee and Bert Wheeler
"Knock Knees"
"Looking for the Lovelight in Your Eyes"
"Dancing The Devil Away" - words by Otto Harbach and Bert Kalmar, music by Harry Ruby, sung by Marguarete Padua and danced by Dorothy Lee
"If I Were a Traveling Salesman" - words and music by Al Dubin and Joe Burke

Reception
The film made a profit of $335,000. The New York Times gave the film a positive review, calling it, "[a] pleasantly irrational screen comedy, with sequences in color and riotous and, at times, ribald buffoonery ..."

Notes
This film contains a fiery Technicolor dance sequence with Anita and the Gypsy Queen, titled .

The Broadway musical this film is based on, The Ramblers, ran from September 1926 through May 1927 at the Lyric Theater. It had lyrics and music by Bert Kalmar and Harry Ruby, with the book by Guy Bolton, Kalmar and Ruby.

The film has three of its musical numbers shot in Technicolor: the aforementioned "Dancing the Devil Away", "Goodbye", and the finale, "I Love You So Much (It's a Wonder You Don't Feel It)".

See also
List of early color feature films

References

External links
 
 

1930 films
1930 musical comedy films
1930s color films
American musical comedy films
Films set in Mexico
RKO Pictures films
Films based on musicals
American films based on plays
Films with screenplays by Roscoe Arbuckle
American black-and-white films
Films directed by Paul Sloane
Early color films
1930s English-language films
1930s American films